Mshindo is an administrative ward in the Iringa Urban district of the Iringa Region of Tanzania. In 2016 the Tanzania National Bureau of Statistics report there were 1,980 people in the ward, from 1,892 in 2012.

Neighborhoods 
The ward has 7 neighborhoods.

 Benki
 Mshindo 'A'
 Mshindo 'B'
 Msikiti
 Mtwa 'A'
 Mtwa 'B'
 Ruaha

References 

Wards of Iringa Region